The Crimes of Thomas Brewster is a Big Finish Productions audio drama based on the long-running British science fiction television series Doctor Who. It was broadcast on BBC Radio 4 Extra from 28 May – 4 June 2016.

Plot 
In modern-day London, Detective Inspector Patricia Menzies is investigating a strange new mob boss known as the Doctor. Meanwhile, the real Doctor is being chased by giant robot mosquitoes and Evelyn Smythe is taking the tube to an alien world.

Cast 
The Doctor – Colin Baker
Evelyn Smythe – Maggie Stables
Thomas Brewster – John Pickard
DI Menzies – Anna Hope
Sergeant Bradshaw – Duncan Wisbey
Raymond Gallagher – David Troughton
Jared – Ashley Kumar
Flip Jackson – Lisa Greenwood
Terravores – Helen Goldwyn

Continuity
Brewster, a Victorian era urchin, stole the TARDIS from the Fifth Doctor in The Haunting of Thomas Brewster. After reuniting, they briefly travelled together, until Brewster chose to stay in modern-day England.
Brewster's time machine was built under the instructions of a gaseous alien pretending to be his mother. This was also in The Haunting of Thomas Brewster, his introduction story.
Menzies previously met the Sixth Doctor in The Condemned and The Raincloud Man. However, from his perspective, those events take place after this story, while travelling with Charley Pollard.
Flip reunites with the Sixth Doctor and travels with him in the first 2012 releases, starting with The Curse of Davros.

References

External links
The Crimes of Thomas Brewster

2011 audio plays
Sixth Doctor audio plays
Radio plays based on Doctor Who
2016 radio dramas
Fiction set in 2011